Urojana is a monotypic moth genus in the family Eupterotidae first described by Max Gaede in 1915. The only known species of this genus is Urojana eborea, which is known from the Ivory Coast.

References

Endemic fauna of Ivory Coast
Janinae
Monotypic moth genera
Insects of West Africa
Moths of Africa